Eupithecia sylpharia is a moth in the family Geometridae. It is found in Brazil.

The wingspan is about 15–17 mm. The forewings are pale pearly grey. The lines are alternately pale brown and grey. They are all very concise and parallel, marked on the veins and folds by minute black scales. The hindwings are whitish and the lines are dark grey and distinct only along the inner margin.

References

Moths described in 1906
sylpharia
Moths of South America